Red Light Fever is the second album by the band Taylor Hawkins and the Coattail Riders. It was released April 20, 2010 and features guest stars Brian May and Roger Taylor of Queen, Dave Grohl of Foo Fighters and Elliot Easton of The Cars.

Track listing
"Not Bad Luck" - 3:34
"Your Shoes" - 2:52
"Way Down" - 3:48
"It's Over" - 4:19
"Hell to Pay" - 4:58
"Sunshine" - 3:32
"Never Enough" - 5:22
"Hole in My Shoes" - 3:54
"James Gang" - 3:33
"Don't Have to Speak" - 3:44
"I Can See It Now" - 3:14
"I Don't Think I Trust You Anymore" - 3:33
"Fall Apart" (iTunes pre-order bonus track) - 4:26
"Shapes of Things" (Japan Bonus Track) - 3:33

Personnel
Taylor Hawkins - lead vocals, drums, piano
Chris Chaney - bass
Gannin Arnold - lead guitar

Additional personnel
Brian May - guitar and backing vocals on "Way Down" and guitar on "Don't Have to Speak"
Roger Taylor - backing vocals on "Your Shoes"
Dave Grohl - rhythm guitar, vocals
Elliot Easton - guitar
Nate Wood - guitar
Drew Hester - percussion

References

2010 albums
Taylor Hawkins and the Coattail Riders albums